Sparebanken Vest is the third largest savings bank in Norway, and the country's second oldest bank. Its predecessor, Bergens Sparebank, was established in 1823. The main offices lie in Bergen, though the bank has branches throughout Hordaland, Sogn og Fjordane and Rogaland.  Sparebanken Vest was previously a member of the SpareBank1 alliance.

References

Banks of Norway
Companies based in Bergen
Banks established in 1823
Companies listed on the Oslo Stock Exchange